Karl Sudrich (7 October 1895 – 18 September 1944) was an Austrian fencer. He competed in the individual and team foil and sabre events at the 1936 Summer Olympics.

He fought in the Wehrmacht and died from his wounds in a military hospital in Hungary during World War II.

References

1895 births
1944 deaths
Austrian male fencers
Olympic fencers of Austria
Fencers at the 1936 Summer Olympics
Austrian military personnel of World War II
Austrian military personnel killed in World War II